Selenophorus aequinoctialis is a species of ground beetle in the family Carabidae. It is found in North America and South America.

References

Harpalinae
Beetles of North America
Articles created by Qbugbot

Beetles described in 1829
Beetles of South America